Cladophialophora is a genus of fungi in the family Herpotrichiellaceae. It has 35 species. The genus contains black yeast-like fungi, some of which are species of important medical significance. Cladophialophora bantiana causes the rare brain disease cerebral phaeohyphomycosis. Cladophialophora carrionii is a common cause of chromoblastomycosis in semi-arid climates. Some of the species are endophytes–associating with plants. For example, Cladophialophora yegresii is a cactus endophyte, which is sometimes introduced into humans via cactus spines.

Taxonomy
The genus was proposed in 1980 by Italian-born Venezuelan microbiologist and mycologist Dante Borelli. The type species was assigned to Cladophialophora ajelloi, which was isolated from a Ugandan case of chromomycosis.

Species
Cladophialophora abundans 
Cladophialophora arxii 
Cladophialophora australiensis 
Cladophialophora bantiana 
Cladophialophora boppii 
Cladophialophora cabanerensis 
Cladophialophora carrionii 
Cladophialophora chaetospira 
Cladophialophora cladoniae 
Cladophialophora devriesii 
Cladophialophora emmonsii 
Cladophialophora eucalypti 
Cladophialophora exuberans 
Cladophialophora floridana 
Cladophialophora hawksworthii 
Cladophialophora hostae 
Cladophialophora humicola 
Cladophialophora immunda 
Cladophialophora matsushimae 
Cladophialophora megalosporae 
Cladophialophora minutissima 
Cladophialophora modesta 
Cladophialophora multiseptata 
Cladophialophora mycetomatis 
Cladophialophora normandinae 
Cladophialophora parmeliae 
Cladophialophora potulentorum 
Cladophialophora psammophila 
Cladophialophora pseudocarrionii 
Cladophialophora pucciniophila 
Cladophialophora samoensis 
Cladophialophora saturnica 
Cladophialophora scillae 
Cladophialophora subtilis 
Cladophialophora sylvestris 
Cladophialophora tortuosa 
Cladophialophora tumbae 
Cladophialophora tumulicola 
Cladophialophora yegresii

References

Eurotiomycetes
Eurotiomycetes genera
Taxa described in 1980